Aurora Gruescu (15 May 1914, Oituz – 2005) was the world's first female forestry engineer, as well as the first Romanian person in the Guinness Book. She worked as a forestry engineer for 25 years. She made considerable contributions to the field of forestry, such as the first national afforestation plan, set on 100,000 hectares, as well as the use of chemical controls of pests in the infested forests around Bucharest.

Biography 
Gruescu was born to the family of teacher Chiriac Dragomir. At the age of 10, she took part in a school trip that aimed to improve students' knowledge of nature. This included a visit to a forest, which had a lasting impact on Gruescu and influenced her decision to later enter forestry.

After graduating from high school in 1933, Gruescu was encouraged by her parents to study medicine. She passed the entry exam and enrolled in the medicine program. However, she left medicine upon deciding it did not appeal to her and enrolled in the forestry faculty. The following autumn, she sat a specialization exam with 129 other candidates for 13 places, which she passed. She was the only female student in that faculty. Forestry was considered a typically masculine career.

Professional work 
Gruescu became an example for many women seeking professional careers, as well as men and women seeking careers in forestry, and she received attention from international organizations for her work. She was an honorary member of the “Progresul Silvic” Society, Prahova branch (1992), and an honorary member of the General Association of Romanian Engineers and of the Ministry of Water, Forests and Environmental Protection (1996). After retirement in 1996, she received the Big Silver Medal at the Romania-Israel Binational Philatelic Exhibition, as well as also a nomination for the title of "Personality of the Year 1997" by The American Biographical Institute. In the spring of 2002, she was named Honorary Citizen of Busteni.

References

Forestry engineers
People from Bacău County
1914 births
2005 deaths
Women in forestry
Romanian women engineers